The Battle of Rheinberg took place on 12 June 1758 in Rheinberg, Germany during the Seven Years' War. A French force under the command of Comte de Clermont and an Anglo-German force under the command of the Duke of Brunswick fought a largely indecisive battle. It was a precursor to the more decisive Battle of Krefeld nine days later.

References

Bibliography
 Anderson, Fred. Crucible of War: The Seven Years' War and the Fate of Empire in British North America, 1754-1766. Faber and Faber, 2001
 McLynn, Frank. 1759: The Year Britain Became Master of the World. Pimlico, 2005.
 Simms, Brendan. Three Victories and a Defeat: The Rise and Fall of the First British Empire. Penguin Books (2008)

Battle of Rheinberg
Battles of the Seven Years' War
Battles involving Great Britain
Battles involving France
Battles involving Hesse-Kassel
1758 in the Holy Roman Empire
Battles in North Rhine-Westphalia